Isher Judge Ahluwalia (1 October 194526 September 2020) was an Indian economist, public policy researcher, and professor. She was Chairperson Emeritus, Board of Governors, at the Indian Council for Research on International Economic Relations (ICRIER). She had also served as the chairperson of the board of the International Food Policy Research Institute, and the chairperson of the Government of India's High-Powered Committee on Urban Infrastructure Services. She was awarded India's 3rd highest civilian award, Padma Bhushan, in 2009.

Ahluwalia's works spanned public policy, urban infrastructure, and sustainable urbanization. Her last book Breaking Through was a memoir and spoke about her career that broke many glass ceilings in the economics and public policy space.

Education
Ahluwalia completed her PhD in economics from Massachusetts Institute of Technology (MIT) with her research focusing on Indian macroeconomy and productivity during the country's economic period between 1951 and 1973, under the American economist Paul Samuelson, and Israeli American economist Stanley Fischer. She also had a master's degree from the Delhi School of Economics, and a bachelor's degree in economics from Presidency College, Kolkata, University of Calcutta. Her research focused on urban development, industrial development, macro-economic reforms, and social sector development issues in India.

Career 

Ahluwalia started her career as a policy economist at the International Monetary Fund in Washington, DC, before moving over to India. In India, she did her research focused on industrial growth and manufacturing productivity. She was a professor at the Centre for Policy Research, where she wrote two books 'Industrial Growth in India: Stagnation since the Mid Sixties', and 'Productivity and Growth in Indian Manufacturing''' between 1989 and 1991.

She went on to become the chairperson of the board of governors at the Indian Council for Research on International Economic Relations, and was earlier the director and chief executive at the same institute from 1998 to 2002. She was a Member of the Government of India's National Manufacturing Competitiveness Council. She was also a member of the Board of Trustees of the International Water Management Institute.

She was appointed chairperson of the High Powered Expert Committee on Urban Infrastructure and Services by the Ministry of Urban Development, and the Ministry of Housing and Urban Poverty Alleviation, Government of India, in 2008. She was chairperson, board of trustees of the International Food Policy Research Institute (IFPRI), in Washington, D.C., from 2003 to 2006, and a member of the board from 2000 She was a member of the Eminent Persons Group (EPG) which prepared a report on the role of the Asian Development Bank from 2006 to 2007, and Member of the Eminent Persons Group on India-ASEAN (Association of South East Asian Nations). She served as the Vice Chairperson of the Punjab State Planning Board from 2005 to 2007.

As an author her works spanned public policy, urban infrastructure, and sustainable urbanization, including challenges in delivery of clean drinking water and solid waste management. Her most recent book prior to her death was a memoir titled 'Breaking Through' published in 2020. The book was a reflection on her career in the economics and public policy management space.

Personal life
Ahluwalia was married to fellow economist, and former deputy chairman of the Indian Planning Commission, Montek Singh Ahluwalia. They had two sons, Pawan and Aman Ahluwalia.

She died from grade IV glioblastoma on 26 September 2020, less than a week before her 75th birthday. She was suffering from brain cancer for the previous 10 months and had stepped down from her position at ICRIER due to her health concerns, a month prior to her death.

Awards
 2009: Padma Bhushan for Literature and Education by the Government of India.
 1987: Batheja Memorial Award for best book on Indian Economy, Industrial Growth in India: Stagnation Since the mid-1960s''.

Selected bibliography

Books

Chapters in books

References

20th-century Indian economists
Presidency University, Kolkata alumni
Indian women economists
Punjabi people
MIT School of Humanities, Arts, and Social Sciences alumni
University of Calcutta alumni
Recipients of the Padma Bhushan in literature & education
1945 births
2020 deaths
Indian Sikhs
20th-century Indian women scientists
20th-century Indian women writers
20th-century Indian writers
21st-century Indian economists
21st-century Indian women scientists
21st-century Indian women writers
21st-century Indian writers
Ahluwalia
Deaths from glioblastoma